Boy Westerhof (born 25 October 1985) is a Dutch professional tennis player and competes mainly on the ATP Challenger Tour and ITF Futures, both in singles and doubles.

Westerhof reached his highest ATP singles ranking, No. 201 on 27 August 2012, and his highest ATP doubles ranking, No. 132, on 8 June 2015.

He made his ATP World Tour main draw debut at the 2013 ATP Vegeta Croatia Open Umag as a qualifier.

Career finals (4)

Doubles (12)

References

External links
 
 

1985 births
Living people
Dutch male tennis players
People from Assen
Sportspeople from Drenthe
21st-century Dutch people